The voiceless palatal fricative is a type of consonantal sound used in some spoken languages.

The symbol ç is the letter c with a cedilla (Ç), as used to spell French and Portuguese words such as façade and ação. However, the sound represented by the letter ç in French and Portuguese orthography is not a voiceless palatal fricative but , the voiceless alveolar fricative.

Palatal fricatives are relatively rare phonemes, and only 5% of the world's languages have  as a phoneme.

There is also the voiceless post-palatal fricative in some languages, which is articulated slightly farther back compared with the place of articulation of the prototypical voiceless palatal fricative, though not as back as the prototypical voiceless velar fricative. The equivalent X-SAMPA symbols are C_- and x_+, respectively.

Especially in broad transcription, the voiceless post-palatal fricative may be transcribed as a palatalized voiceless velar fricative ( in the IPA, x' or x_j in X-SAMPA).

Some scholars also posit the voiceless palatal approximant distinct from the fricative.

Features

Features of the voiceless palatal fricative:

 The otherwise identical post-palatal variant is articulated slightly behind the hard palate, making it sound slightly closer to the velar .

Occurrence

Palatal

Post-palatal

See also
 Index of phonetics articles

Notes

References

External links
 
 
 

Fricative consonants
Central consonants
Palatal consonants
Voiceless oral consonants
Pulmonic consonants